Prahaar is a Marathi language newspaper, printed in India with regional editions in Mumbai, Thane, Ratnagiri and Sindhudurg. It is owed by Narayan Rane's Rane Prakashan Pvt Ltd., and has been called Rane's mouthpiece. In 2016 its editor was Madhukar Bhave. 

In December 2016, its Mumbai edition had a circulation of 1,50,000.

See also
 List of Marathi-language newspapers
 List of newspapers in India

External links 
 Prahaar website
 Prahaars English website
 Prahaar featured on Newseum

References 

Newspapers published in Maharashtra
Marathi-language newspapers
Publications with year of establishment missing